The Open de Portugal, previously the Portuguese Open, is an annual professional golf tournament, currently played on the Challenge Tour.

History
It was first played in 1953, and was part of the European Tour's schedule from 1973 to 2010. After a hiatus, the tournament returned in 2017 as a dual-ranking event on both the European Tour and the second-tier Challenge Tour. Matt Wallace won the event claiming his first European Tour victory. Since 2017 it continued as Challenge Tour-only event. However, in 2020, as part of major changes to the season due to the COVID-19 pandemic, it returned to the European Tour schedule as a dual-ranking event. Garrick Higgo won the 2020 event for his maiden European Tour win.

In 2021, the event returned as a sole-sanctioned Challenge Tour event.

Winners

Notes

References

External links
Coverage on the Challenge Tour's official site
Coverage on the European Tour's official site

Challenge Tour events
Former European Tour events
Golf tournaments in Portugal
Recurring sporting events established in 1953
Summer events in Portugal